Kurt Hans Biedenkopf (28 January 1930 – 12 August 2021) was a German jurist, academic teacher and politician of the Christian-Democratic Union (CDU). He was rector of the Ruhr University Bochum.

Biedenkopf made a political career first in North Rhine-Westphalia, where he was chairman of the party. After the re-unification of Germany, he served as the first Minister President of the Free State of Saxony from 1990 until 2002. He was 54th president of the Bundesrat from 2000, overseeing the body's move from Bonn to Berlin. Biedenkopf is regarded as the intellectual leader of the CDU when Helmut Kohl was chancellor.

Biedenkopf worked on advisory boards of institutions including the Bertelsmann Stiftung, Deutsche Nationalstiftung, Dresden Frauenkirche, Independent Commission on Turkey and the Staatliche Porzellan-Manufaktur Meissen. Among his numerous recognitions were international honorific doctorates.

Early life and science 
Biedenkopf was born in Ludwigshafen am Rhein. When his father became technical director of the Buna-Werke, the family moved to Schkopau, where he attended school. Biedenkopf first studied political sciences from 1949 to 1950 at the Davidson College in North Carolina and at Georgetown University. He then studied economics and law in Germany at the University of Munich, achieving a law doctorate in 1958. He obtained a Master in Law in 1962 from Georgetown University, where he studied and researched again from 1958 to 1959 and 1961 to 1962. In 1963 Biedenkopf completed his habilitation at Goethe University Frankfurt. He became lecturer of the Ruhr University Bochum in 1964. In 1967, he was appointed rector of the university; he was the youngest head of a university in West Germany at the time. He was lecturer and visiting professor also at the Goethe University Frankfurt and Leipzig University. In the early 1970s, Biedenkopf moved to the board of Henkel.

Political career

Career in national politics
Biedenkopf was a member of the Christian-Democratic Union (CDU). He entered his professional political career when he became secretary general of the CDU in 1973, under the leadership of chairman Helmut Kohl. He resigned from that office in 1977 after disagreements with Kohl and went on to become one of his fiercest rivals within the party.

From 1977 to 1983 he was deputy chairman of the CDU in Germany. During the terms 1976–1980 and 1987–1990 he was a member of the Bundestag.

In 1979, it was revealed that Christel Broszey, Biedenkopf's secretary, disappeared and was presumed to have fled to East Germany. Media reported that Broszey had been a spy.

Career in North Rhine-Westphalia
In the 1980, state elections in North Rhine-Westphalia, Biedenkopf unsuccessfully ran against the incumbent Minister-President Johannes Rau. He served as chairman of the CDU in North Rhine-Westphalia – the party's largest chapter – until 1987, when he was succeeded by Norbert Blüm. In late 1989, he joined forces with Lothar Späth, Heiner Geißler, Rita Süssmuth and others in an unsuccessful effort to oust Kohl as CDU chairman.

Minister-President of Saxony
After the re-unification of Germany in 1990 Biedenkopf was elected as Minister-President in the newly formed state of Saxony. His party also won the subsequent elections in 1994 and 1999 with an absolute majority. He held his office until April 2002.

At the CDU's initiative, the state parliament resolved to declare Saxony a "free state" once again, recalling its 19th century history. Early in his tenure, Biedenkopf emerged as a kind of unofficial spokesman for the regions of East Germany. He enjoyed great popularity among a majority of the people of Saxony. Known for his autocratic leadership style, he was often referred to as "the Saxon King" or "King Kurt". During his time in office, he doubled outlays on primary and secondary education and sharply ramped up spending on research and development. He also led a legal battle against the European Commission on subsidies for Volkswagen investments in Saxony.

Ahead of the German presidential election in 1994, Biedenkopf was widely seen as a likely candidate, but the post went to Roman Herzog.

In 2000, Biedenkopf held the rotating presidency of the Bundesrat of Germany. In this capacity, he oversaw the body's move to Berlin to complete the government's return to the pre-World War II capital from Bonn.

In January 2001, Biedenkopf dismissed State Minister of Finance Georg Milbradt because Milbradt had started a debate about Biedenkopf's succession. Milbradt eventually succeeded Biedenkopf in 2002.

Death
Biedenkopf died in Dresden on 12 August 2021 at the age of 91.

Political positions

Before the introduction of the euro, Biedenkopf was the only German state leader to vote against the monetary union in the Bundesrat, the legislative body that represents the German states; he later argued that "Europe wasn't ready for that epochal step." Already in 1997, he had joined the ministers-president of two other German states, Gerhard Schröder and Edmund Stoiber, in making the case for a five-year delay in Europe's currency union.

Ahead of the Christian Democrats' leadership election in 2018, Biedenkopf publicly endorsed Annegret Kramp-Karrenbauer to succeed Angela Merkel as the party's chair. He later supported Armin Laschet's candidacy to succeed Kramp-Karrenbauer in the 2021 leadership election.

Other activities
In 1983, Biedenkopf became a member of the advisory board of the non-profit Bertelsmann Stiftung. In 1987, he became chairman of the board (until 1990). During his term, the Carl Bertelsmann Prize (today Reinhard Mohn Prize) was awarded for the first time.

Between 2004 and 2006, Biedenkopf and Christine Bergmann served as ombuds, observing the impact of the Schröder government's labour market reforms, with a mandate to advise government and parliament on any recommended revisions to it. In 2005, he was appointed by Chancellor Gerhard Schröder to head a commission on the future of codetermination in Germany. Both Biedenkopf and Schröder later served as mediators in a 2006 conflict over privatisation plans at German railway operator Deutsche Bahn; the plans eventually fell through.

In addition, Biedenkopf held a number of paid and unpaid positions, including: 
 Dresden Frauenkirche, member of the board of trustees
 International Law Institute (ILI), member of the international advisory board
 Independent Commission on Turkey, member
 Stifterverband für die Deutsche Wissenschaft, member of the board of trustees
 Hertie School of Governance, chairman of the board of trustees (2003–2010)
 Lions Club Germany Foundation, member
 Staatliche Porzellan-Manufaktur Meissen, chairman of the supervisory board (1991–2015)

Recognition

 1974: Honorary doctorate, Davidson College, Davidson, US
 1978: Honorary doctorate, Georgetown University, Washington, US
 1991: Decoration of Honour for Services to the Republic of Austria
 1993: Honorary doctorate, New School for Social Research, New York, US
 1993: Hans Böckler Prize
 1994: Honorary doctorate, Catholic University of Brussels, Belgium
 1994: Royal Norwegian Order of Merit
 1997: Order of Merit of the Free State of Saxony
 2002: Constitutional Medal of Saxony
 2003: Brückepreis
 2008: Honorary doctorate, HHL Leipzig Graduate School of Management
 2011: Honorary citizen of Gröditz
 2017: Order of Merit of North Rhine-Westphalia
 2021: Honorary doctorate, University of Leipzig

See also 
 Politics of Germany

References

External links 

 Kurt Biedenkopf in the CDU parliamentary group in the state parliament of Saxony

1930 births
2021 deaths
People from Ludwigshafen
People from the Palatinate (region)
Hertie School people
Presidents of the German Bundesrat
Ministers-President of Saxony
Members of the Landtag of North Rhine-Westphalia
Members of the Landtag of Saxony
Grand Crosses 1st class of the Order of Merit of the Federal Republic of Germany
Recipients of the Order of Merit of the Free State of Saxony
Members of the Order of Merit of North Rhine-Westphalia
Members of the Bundestag for North Rhine-Westphalia
Members of the Bundestag 1987–1990
Members of the Bundestag 1976–1980
Members of the Bundestag for the Christian Democratic Union of Germany